William Bart Saxbe (June 24, 1916 – August 24, 2010) was an American diplomat and politician affiliated with the Republican Party, who served as a U.S. Senator for Ohio, and was the Attorney General for Presidents Richard M. Nixon and Gerald R. Ford, and as the U.S. Ambassador to India.

At the time of his death, Saxbe was the oldest living Republican Senator and the second-oldest living Senator overall (after Harry F. Byrd Jr. of Virginia).

Early life and career

Saxbe was born 1916 in Mechanicsburg, Ohio, the son of Faye Henry "Maggie" (née Carey) Saxbe, and Bart Rockwell Saxbe.

He received a bachelor's degree, from The Ohio State University, Class of 1940, where he was a member of the Chi Phi Fraternity.  He served in the U.S. Army Air Forces, during World War II, from 1940 to 1945, and Korean War, from 1951 to 1952.

When he returned from World War II, he entered Ohio State University law school. However, while still in law school, he campaigned for the Ohio House of Representatives during 1947, and won.  During 1948, when Saxbe was near the end of second term, he received a law degree.

He remained in the Ohio National Guard and was on active duty during the Korean War, from 1951 to 1952. He was discharged from the reserve with the rank of colonel during 1963.  He served as the Ohio House majority leader during 1951 and 1952, and as speaker of the House during 1953 and 1954.

Political career
During 1957, Saxbe was elected Ohio Attorney General, defeating Democrat  Stephen M. Young. He was re-elected three times and had that office until 1968. In this capacity, Saxbe argued the murder case of Doctor Sam Sheppard before the United States Supreme Court during 1966, against Sheppard's attorney F. Lee Bailey.

He was a member of the Ohio Crime Commission from 1967 to 1968. During 1968, Saxbe was elected to the U.S. Senate, defeating the Democratic candidate, former Ohio Rep. (1965–67) John J. Gilligan. During his campaign, he became a prominent supporter of a national health insurance system. When President Nixon resumed bombing North Vietnam in late 1972, Saxbe stated that the President had 'lost his senses'.

He served in the Senate until January 4, 1974, when Nixon appointed him U.S. Attorney General.  Saxbe was the permanent replacement for Elliot Richardson, who had been dismissed by Nixon during the Watergate scandal's so-called "Saturday Night Massacre".  Saxbe took over from Solicitor General Robert Bork, who had served as acting Attorney General after the "Massacre".

There was some minor controversy regarding Saxbe's appointment and the Ineligibility Clause of the Constitution. That provision states that a legislator cannot be appointed to an executive position during the same term that the legislature had voted to increase the salary of said position. Nixon addressed the problem by having Congress reduce the salary of the Attorney General to $35,000, as it was before Saxbe's term in the Senate began.  This maneuver had only occurred once before, when Senator Philander C. Knox had been appointed Secretary of State during 1909, and has since become known as the "Saxbe fix".  Because there was not any perception that anything intentional had been done to benefit Saxbe, the matter was largely ignored.

As Attorney General for Nixon, Saxbe supervised the antitrust suit that ultimately ended the Bell System telephone monopoly.

Gilligan, who had been elected Governor of Ohio during 1970, appointed Howard Metzenbaum to serve Saxbe's vacated term. Later that year, former astronaut John Glenn, another Democrat, was elected to replace Saxbe.

Saxbe served as U.S. Attorney General for the first few months of the President Ford Administration, before resigning in early 1975, when he was appointed United States Ambassador to India.  He served in that capacity until 1977. After that, Saxbe returned to Mechanicsburg and resumed the practice of law.

Personal life
During 1940, Saxbe married the former Ardath Louise "Dolly" Kleinhans.  They had three children: William Bart Saxbe Jr., Juliet Louise "Juli" Saxbe Spitzer, and Charles Rockwell "Rocky" Saxbe. Charles Saxbe served four terms in Ohio House of Representatives, and later as an attorney in private practice.

Saxbe was known for his quips. Asked about Sen. Robert Dole, he commented that Dole was so unpopular with his fellow senators that he "couldn't sell beer on a troop ship".

He died in his hometown of Mechanicsburg, Ohio at the age of 94 on August 24, 2010.

References

External links

United States Attorneys General
Ambassadors of the United States to India
Ohio Attorneys General
Speakers of the Ohio House of Representatives
Republican Party members of the Ohio House of Representatives
United States Army Air Forces personnel of World War II
Ohio State University alumni
Ohio State University Moritz College of Law alumni
People from Mechanicsburg, Ohio
1916 births
2010 deaths
Republican Party United States senators from Ohio
Nixon administration cabinet members
Ford administration cabinet members
20th-century American politicians
American Episcopalians
Ohio National Guard personnel
United States Army personnel of the Korean War
United States Army reservists
United States Army colonels